A list of films produced in the United Kingdom in 1974 (see 1974 in film):

1974

See also
1974 in British music
1974 in British radio
1974 in British television
1974 in the United Kingdom

References

External links
 

1974
Films
Lists of 1974 films by country or language